Lasha Gobadze (born 10 January 1994) is a Georgian sport wrestler who competes in the men's Greco Roman category and a current world champion in the men's 82kg Greco Roman event. He claimed gold medal in the men's 82 kg event during the 2019 World Wrestling Championships. In March 2021, he qualified at the European Qualification Tournament to compete at the 2020 Summer Olympics in Tokyo, Japan. He competed in the 87 kg event.

References

External links
 
 
 

1994 births
Living people
People from Khulo
Male sport wrestlers from Georgia (country)
World Wrestling Championships medalists
European Wrestling Championships medalists
Wrestlers at the 2020 Summer Olympics
Olympic wrestlers of Georgia (country)